Paris Michael Lenon (born November 26, 1977) is a former American football linebacker. He was signed by the Carolina Panthers of the NFL as an undrafted free agent in the spring of 2000, then chosen by the Memphis Maniax in the XFL Draft in the fall of 2000. He played college football at University of Richmond.

Lenon was a member of the Panthers, the Maniax, then the NFL's Green Bay Packers, Seattle Seahawks, Detroit Lions, New England Patriots, St. Louis Rams, and Arizona Cardinals. Lenon was the last active NFL player to have played in the XFL.

Early years
Lenon attended Heritage High School in Lynchburg, Virginia and won two varsity letters each in football and basketball, and one in baseball. In football, he played free safety and quarterback, and was named the Western District Defensive Player of the Year. Lenon graduated from Heritage High School in 1995.

College career
Lenon attended the University of Richmond and was a four-year letterman and a three-year starter in football. As a redshirt sophomore in 1997, Lenon recorded a career-high 104 tackles. He was selected to the First-team All-Atlantic 10 Conference  in 1997. He was named to the second-team All-Atlantic 10 in his senior season in 1998. He finished his college career with 45 games played, 320 tackles, 12 sacks, and four forced fumbles.

Professional career

Carolina Panthers
Lenon was signed by the Carolina Panthers as an undrafted free agent following the 2000 NFL Draft, but was released by the team on June 9, 2000.

Memphis Maniax
After spending the 2000 season out of football, Lenon was a member of the Memphis Maniax in the XFL's only season, 2001.

Green Bay Packers
Following the XFL's season, Lenon signed with the Green Bay Packers on April 26, 2001. He was waived by the team on July 24, 2001.

Seattle Seahawks
Lenon was signed by the Seattle Seahawks on August 16, 2001 and was waived by the team on August 27, 2001.

Green Bay Packers (second stint)
Lenon re-joined the Packers on December 27, joining their practice squad for the remainder of the regular season and the playoffs. After the season, he was allocated to the Amsterdam Admirals of NFL Europe for the spring 2002 season. In 2002, Lenon played in all 16 games for the Packers, mainly on special teams. He played in all 16 games in 2003 and 2004 for the Packers, starting four games in 2004 at linebacker. Lenon started 12 games in 2005, his final season with the Packers.

Detroit Lions
Lenon signed a three-year deal with the Detroit Lions March 22, 2006. On December 23, 2007, Lenon intercepted a pass by Brodie Croyle and returned it 61 yards for a touchdown, in a 25-20 victory over the Kansas City Chiefs. His 2007 season was his career best. He totaled 116 tackles (86 solo, 30 assisted), 2 forced fumbles and 1 interception. Lenon was also the team leader in tackles in the 2008 season, the third straight year he started all 16 games for the Lions (in spite of the fact the Lions did not win a single game that year).

New England Patriots

Lenon signed with the New England Patriots on May 27, 2009. He was released on September 5, 2009.

St. Louis Rams
Lenon signed with the St. Louis Rams on September 16, 2009. Lenon became the starting weak side linebacker after Will Witherspoon was traded to the Eagles. Lenon tied for the team lead with three forced fumbles.

Arizona Cardinals
Lenon signed with the Arizona Cardinals on March 15, 2010.

Denver Broncos
On August 20, 2013, Lenon was signed by the Denver Broncos. During the Broncos' 2013 season he played in 14 regular season and three postseason games, including Super Bowl XLVIII.

References

External links

Denver Broncos bio 
New England Patriots bio

1977 births
Living people
Sportspeople from Lynchburg, Virginia
Players of American football from Virginia
African-American players of American football
American football linebackers
Richmond Spiders football players
Memphis Maniax players
Amsterdam Admirals players
Green Bay Packers players
Seattle Seahawks players
Detroit Lions players
New England Patriots players
St. Louis Rams players
Arizona Cardinals players
Denver Broncos players
21st-century African-American sportspeople
20th-century African-American sportspeople